is a railway station in the town of  Matsushima, Miyagi Prefecture, Japan, operated by East Japan Railway Company (JR East).

Lines
Matsushima-Kaigan Station is served by the Senseki Line. It is located 23.2 rail kilometers from the terminus of the Senseki Line at Aoba-dōri Station.

Station layout
The station has one elevated island platform with the station building underneath. The station has a Midori no Madoguchi staffed ticket office.

Platforms

History
The line was nationalized on May 1, 1944 and the station was renamed to its present name at that time. The station was absorbed into the JR East network upon the privatization of JNR on April 1, 1987. The station was closed from March 11 to May 28, 2011 due to damage associated with the 2011 Tōhoku earthquake and tsunami.

Passenger statistics
In fiscal 2018, the station was used by an average of 1,164 passengers daily (boarding passengers only).

Surrounding area
Matsushima
Zuigan-ji

See also
 List of railway stations in Japan

References

External links

 

Railway stations in Miyagi Prefecture
Senseki Line
Railway stations in Japan opened in 1927
Stations of East Japan Railway Company
Matsushima, Miyagi